The 1987 Superstition Hills and Elmore Ranch earthquakes were a pair of earthquakes measuring  6.0 and 6.5 that rattled the Imperial Valley of California. The earthquakes caused damage in Southern California and Mexico, but was limited due to their location in a sparsely populated area. It was felt as far as Las Vegas and Phoenix. More than 90 were injured, and two people were killed in Mexico.

Geology 
The Imperial Valley is a seismically active area in California. It is in this area where the San Andreas Fault and San Jacinto Fault Zone (SJFZ) terminate in the south. This region is a transition zone between the continental transform boundary to oceanic rifting in the Gulf of California. South of the San Andreas Fault and between the Imperial Fault is the Brawley Seismic Zone—the northernmost ridge feature in the Gulf of California ridge–transform boundary. Faults in the Brawley Seismic Zone typically trend northeast, perpendicular to the plate boundary faults. Labeled "cross-faults", these are oriented perpendicular to the direction of rifting and have been inferred to be normal faults. However, recent seismic activity show that these faults produce left-lateral strike-slip motion.

The SJFZ is a -long right-lateral structure that runs parallel to the San Andreas Fault. The SJFZ is southern California's most seismically active fault zone. It was responsible for the large surface-rupturing Borrego Mountain earthquake in 1968. It is a highly segmented fault zone consisting of seven individually named segments. One of these segments is the Superstition Hills Fault, a vertically-dipping, -long section. In 1951, a magnitude 5.6 earthquake caused it to generate a small surface rupture. It also produced triggered slip following the 1968 Borrego Mountain and 1979 Imperial Valley earthquakes.

Earthquakes

Elmore Ranch earthquake
The location of its aftershocks strongly implied rupture occurred along a northeast striking fault zone. The aftershock zone also implied that the mainshock ruptured in a bilateral nature; northeast towards the Brawley Seismic Zone and southwest, where it traverse the Superstition Hills Fault. The fault zone responsible for this earthquake was unidentified prior to 1987, but it was later named Elmore Ranch Fault Zone (ERFZ). The fault ruptured for  but surface ruptures was only observed for half that length.

Superstition Hills earthquake
The Superstition Hills earthquake measured  6.5 at  depth. It occurred nearly 12 hours after the Elmore Ranch earthquake. The epicenter was located at the northwestern termination of the Superstition Hills Fault, where it intersects the ERFZ. An aftershock zone roughly parallel to the Superstition Hills Fault formed, although it was several kilometers southwest of the main rupture trace. No surface rupture was detected along the fault after the Elmore Ranch earthquake. The Superstition Hills Fault continued to produce slip even a year after the mainshock.

Ground motion

Strong motion data was first compiled by the U.S. Coast and Geodetic Survey in 1932 with the instillation of an accelerograph at El Centro. Up till 1987, nearly 700 strong motion data (accelerograms) have been gathered from earthquakes in the Imperial Valley. The 1987 earthquakes produced 65 accelerograms from 40 stations across the valley. Horizontal peak ground accelerations (pga) during the Elmore Ranch earthquake exceeded 0.1 g at six stations.

During the Superstition Hills earthquake, 25 stations recorded a maximum horizontal pga exceeding 0.1 g within  of the epicenter. These stations recorded a pga nearing or were greater than 0.3 g. The Superstition Mountain station recorded a pga that was the largest and longest ever observed in its 55-year history of data records. A pga of 0.9 g and 0.7 g in both horizontal direction and 0.6 g in vertical direction was recorded.

Triggered slip
Surface ruptures were observed on the central section of the Coyote Creek Fault, another segment of the SJFZ. The Coyote Creek Fault was associated with the 1968 earthquake. This section of the fault produced considerable afterslip and vertical displacements after the 1968 earthquake. It is located roughly to the north of the 1987 earthquakes. Minor vertical displacements were also recorded. Creepmeters also indicated that several millimeters of slip occurred on the San Andreas Fault, but was insufficient to create a surface rupture. Triggered slip was also measured on the Imperial Fault.

Impact 
Damage from the Elmore Ranch earthquake in Calipatria, El Centro, Heber and Westmorland corresponded to VI on the Modified Mercalli intensity scale (MMI). The Superstition Hills earthquake had a maximum MMI of VI–VII at El Centro and Westmorland. Intensity VI was felt at Brawley, Calexico, Calipatria, Heber, Holtville, Imperial and Seeley. It was widely felt across southern California. Shaking was also felt in Las Vegas, Nevada and Tempe, Arizona. In Mexico, the earthquake was felt in Tijuana and Ensenada. Although both earthquakes were larger than the one that struck Whittier Narrows last month, damage was moderate due to their location in the sparsely populated valley.

United States 
Telephone services were affected because the earthquake had destroyed some lines. Minor damage was reported in Calipatria, El Centro, Heber and Westmorland. At the epicentral area, damage was limited to fallen chimneys, broken underground pipes, broken windows, and large displacements in roads. A bridge across the New River required repairs on both sides due to liquefaction. At the Desert Test Range Control Center in Westmorland, equipment fell through a window and water tanks tilted. Operations at the facility ceased for several days.

About 40 mobile homes were wrenched from their stands. The Southern California Irrigation District estimated $600,000 to $750,000 of damage to canal facilities. The initial earthquake resulted in minor buckling of the canal concrete reinforce while the second shock collapsed many of the concrete. In Calexico, the wall of a furniture store collapsed on automobiles, and in El Centro, another brick wall fell onto a car. Many homes and businesses lost power following the earthquake. Fifty people were injured in Imperial County. California 86 between Westmorland and El Centro was damaged and closed off. California 98 was closed at Ocotillo at the junction with Interstate 8 after a road buckled.

Mexico 
Forty-four were injured in Mexico. The injuries included broken bones, sprains, cuts, and some heart attacks. In Mexicali, hundreds evacuated from buildings, and 35 were damaged, including several hospitals. Structural damage and fires were reported in some buildings. Two people, a woman and her child were killed as they were fleeing a factory and was struck by an oncoming vehicle.

Response
The Elmore Ranch earthquake forced the closure of a runway at the Naval Air Facility El Centro but no damage was found after inspection.  The shaking triggered an "unusual event" declaration at the San Onofre nuclear plant, but the facility was unaffected. An entry station between Mexicali and Calexico was closed for damage inspection.

In Los Angeles, tremors were felt but there was no damage. The Los Angeles County fire dispatcher reported calls from residents asking if there had been an earthquake. Many people were frightened by the earthquake, in the wake of an earlier and deadly event two months earlier. In Orange County, people started stoking up on survival appliances such as water purification tablets and water bottles for their earthquake preparedness kits. The California Department of Transportation began inspecting freeways for possible damage. San Diego city councils were having a conference on the 12th floor when the first earthquake struck, causing some panic in the room. The San Diego Fire Department reported minor cracks to five of their stations.

See also 

 List of earthquakes in the United States
 List of earthquakes in California

References

External links
 
 

1987 earthquakes
November 1987 events in the United States
Earthquakes in the United States
Earthquakes in California
Earthquakes in Mexico
History of Imperial County, California
Imperial Valley
1987 in Mexico
1987 in California
1987 natural disasters
1987 natural disasters in the United States
Disasters in California
Disasters in Mexico
Doublet earthquakes
Geology of Imperial County, California
1987 disasters in North America